TOPCAT is an interactive graphical viewer and editor for tabular data.  Although a general purpose tool capable of handling large and sparse datasets with correlation functionality its specialist application area is astronomy and it was initially designed to support virtual observatories. It is able to handle several digital file formats including FITS which is in common use in astronomy.  The Acronym TOPCAT derives from Tool for OPerations on Catalogues And Tables.

History 
The project was initially developed by  Mark Taylor, an astrophysicist from the University of Bristol in 2003. Taylor acknowledges inspiration for some features from Mirage from  Bell Labs and VOPlot from VO-India.  Initially funded from the Starlink Project it has been funded by various other projects since.

Features 
Written in Java, TOPCAT can be used both standalone and within a web browser. It is suitable for use as a graphical viewer and data editor of tabular data from FITS and other sources.  Muna, in his 2016 paper "Introducing Nightlight: A New FITS Viewer", observes that SAOImage DS9, TOPCAT and Fv are the most common tools used to view FITS files.  VisIVO is an alternative tool for working with virtual observatories.

While TOPCAT is unable to visualise catalogues as a set of vectors it does have capabilities to explore correlations in two and three dimensional scatter plots.

STILTS 
The STILTS application complements TOPCAT with similar capabilities but is considered a steeper learning curve, however STILTS does have the advantage of being able to be scripted.

Applications 
TOPCAT is used in training for use of virtual observatories, including access via the Astronomical Data Query Language (ADQL). Applications using TOPCAT include MultiDark, a database for results from cosmological simulations.

References

Sources

External links 
 * 

Free plotting software